Gymnachirus nudus, the naked sole, also known as the flabby sole, is a species of sole in the family Achiridae. It was described by Johann Jakob Kaup in 1858. It is known from throughout the western Atlantic.

The naked sole is currently ranked as Least Concern by the IUCN redlist, due to a lack of known threats to the species, although it makes note that it is sometimes harvested as bycatch in trawls for shrimp and other fish.

References

Pleuronectiformes
Fish described in 1858
Taxa named by Johann Jakob Kaup